Ivana Buzková (née: Hudziecová; born 31 March 1985) is a Czech former competitive figure skater. She is a two-time (2006–07) Czech national champion.

Programs

Results

References

External links 
 

Czech female single skaters
1985 births
Living people
People from Český Těšín
Competitors at the 2005 Winter Universiade
Sportspeople from the Moravian-Silesian Region